Dameron City, Texas is a ghost town in Midland County, Texas, USA. It was founded in 1911.

References

1911 establishments in Texas
Unincorporated communities in Midland County, Texas
Ghost towns in Texas
Unincorporated communities in Texas